Khalifa Cohen (died 9 July 1932) was a rabbi of Djerba, Tunisia. He was the author of Sifte renanot, a commentary on the Psalms, and Ḳunteris ha-semikhut, notes on diverse subjects.

Publications

References
 

19th-century births
1932 deaths
19th-century Tunisian rabbis
20th-century Tunisian rabbis
People from Djerba